Home Federal may refer to:

Home Federal Bank, headquartered in Sioux Falls, South Dakota

See also